Henry Leonard Bowe (27 October 1885 – 22 May 1954) was an Australian rules footballer who played with Essendon in the Victorian Football League (VFL).

Bowe was a specialist defender and played in back to back Essendon premiership teams in 1911 and 1912. In 1912 he also represented Victoria in two interstate matches against the South Australians. He retired in 1920 after he began suffering from athlete's heart.

External links

AustralianFootball.com profile
Essendon Football Club profile

1885 births
1954 deaths
Australian rules footballers from Victoria (Australia)
Essendon Football Club players
Essendon Football Club Premiership players
People from Maldon, Victoria
Two-time VFL/AFL Premiership players